The Unauthorised History of New Zealand is a New Zealand comedic history talk show series that tells the "real truth" behind the history of New Zealand.

Synopsis

Some of the archive footage seen on the show has never been seen on television before because it was deemed too shocking by TV executives to screen at the time. Some material created for the programme, including the 1920s-style animated series Happy Hori, is presented as though it were archival.

The series does not tackle history chronologically; instead, each episode explores a topic.

The nation was shaped by visitors, and the first episode examines the impact of such diverse guests as sheep, Colonel Sanders, the Shah of Iran and Muhammad Ali on New Zealand.  Famous troublemakers such as Hongi Hika, the Ingham Twins and the Neil Roberts' (the suicide bomber and the TV producer) feature in an episode devoted to Trouble.

Other episodes in the series consider some of the country's most powerful people, its legends, and reveal some of the most shocking and sexiest moments in the nation's history.

Episodes

Series 1 (2005)

Series 2 (2007)

Series 3 (2008)

Series 4 (2008)

Crew
Lee Baker (director)
Jonathan Brough (Director 'Dr Rangi' & various segments)

References

External links

Extracts from the show and interview with Wells

2000s New Zealand television series
2005 New Zealand television series debuts
2008 New Zealand television series endings
New Zealand satirical television shows
Television shows funded by NZ on Air
TVNZ 1 original programming